is a Japanese manga series written and illustrated by Haruhiko Mikimoto. Officially part of Sunrise's long running Gundam franchise, the manga was serialized in Kadokawa Shoten's Gundam Ace from 2001 to 2011 and was compiled into twelve tankōbon volumes. It was licensed in North America by Tokyopop, who released nine volumes, and in France the manga is licensed and published by Pika Édition. The manga is the first work in the franchise to feature a main female lead.

Plot summary
Beginning in Universal Century 0085, Asuna Elmarit is a student from École du Ciel, a military school for training future MS pilots. Unexpected events occur, exposing Asuna and her classmates to the reality that is war. Along the way, the school council's real intentions are revealed.

Manga
Kadokawa Shoten published the first tankōbon volume of the manga on November 22, 2002. Tokyopop published the first tankōbon volume of the manga on September 13, 2005, they released nine in total. Pika Édition released the first tankōbon volume of the manga in France on March 15, 2005.

|}

References

External links

Ecole du Ciel
Manga series
Tokyopop titles
2000 manga
Shōnen manga